Goodmanson is a surname. Notable people with the surname include:

John Goodmanson (born 1968), American record producer
Richard Goodmanson, American businessman